Sheper (definite form: Sheperi) is a community in the Gjirokastër County, southern Albania. Sheperi is the largest village of the former Zagori municipality. At the 2015 local government reform it became part of the municipality Libohovë. It is mountain village located 30 km from the city of Gjirokastër, about 800 meters above sea level. Due to heavy migration, its current population is about 100 inhabitants. Sheper is inhabited by an Orthodox Albanian population.

Demographics 
Sheper is inhabited by an Orthodox Albanian population and some Aromanian families. The Aromanian presence in Sheper dates to the 20th century when during the communist era in Albania they settled in the area.

Notable people
Andon Zako Çajupi
Mihal Kasso
Aristidh Ruci                       
Ilia Dilo Sheperi                
Pano Xhamballo
Kiço Ngjela, politician of the Communist Albania
Jorgo Bulo, philologist, historian, literary critic

References

Populated places in Libohovë
Villages in Gjirokastër County